Waterhouse From old German / Dutch, meaning a house by water. Most common in the Derbyshire, Lancashire and Yorkshire regions Old English locational surname.

Notable people with this surname include

A
 Agnes Waterhouse (c. 1503 – 1566), first woman executed for witchcraft in England
 Alfred Waterhouse (1830–1905), English architect
 Andrew Waterhouse (1958–2001), British poet and musician
 Annie Waterhouse ( 1814 – 1896), English illustrator, engraver, woodcutter and teacher

B
 Benjamin Waterhouse (1754–1846), American physician
 Benjamin Waterhouse Hawkins (1807–1894), English sculptor and natural history artist
 Bertrand James Waterhouse (1876–1965), Australian architect 
 Bill Waterhouse (1922–2019), Australian barrister and bookmaker

C
Charles Waterhouse (disambiguation), several names
Charles Owen Waterhouse (1843–1917), English entomologist
Charles Waterhouse (artist) (born 1924), American painter, illustrator and sculptor
Charles Waterhouse (British politician) (1893–1975), Conservative MP
Charles Waterhouse, founder of Deerhurst Resort
 Clive Waterhouse (born 1974), Australian rules footballer

D
 Daniel Waterhouse, fictional character from Neal Stephenson's The Baroque Cycle novels
 David Waterhouse (disambiguation), several people
 David Waterhouse (Canadian football), see 1987 CFL Draft
 David Waterhouse (MP) for Aldborough (UK Parliament constituency) and Berwick-upon-Tweed
 Doug Waterhouse (1916–2000), Australian entomologist, inventor of the active ingredient in Aerogard

E
 Eben Gowrie Waterhouse (1881–1977), Australian academic and horticulturist
 Edward Waterhouse (FRS) (1619–1670)
 Edwin Waterhouse (1841–1917), English accountant, co-founder of "Price Waterhouse"
 Elisabeth Waterhouse, English pianist and music teacher
 Ellis Waterhouse (1905–1985), English art historian
 Esther Kenworthy Waterhouse (1857–1944), British artist

F
 Frederick George Waterhouse (1815–1898), English naturalist, first curator of the South Australian Museum

G
 Gai Waterhouse (born 1954), Scottish-born Australian horse trainer
 George Waterhouse (disambiguation), multiple people, including
George Robert Waterhouse (1810–1888), British naturalist
George Waterhouse (politician) (1824–1906), Premier of South Australia and Premier of New Zealand
George Waterhouse (footballer) (1899–1931), Australian rules footballer
 Gilbert Waterhouse (1883–1916), English architect and war poet
 Graham Waterhouse (born 1962), English composer and cellist, son of William Waterhouse

H
 Helen Thomas Waterhouse, archaeologist of ancient Greece
 Henry Waterhouse (1770–1812), British naval officer associated with European settlement of Australia
 Herbert Furnivall Waterhouse, (1864–1931), British surgeon and lecturer in anatomy

J
 Jabez Waterhouse (1821–1891), Australian Methodist minister
 Joey Waterhouse (born 1988), English footballer
 Rev. John Waterhouse, missionary father of George Waterhouse (politician)
 John Waterhouse (astronomer) (1806–1879), inventor of Waterhouse stops in photography
 John Waterhouse (headmaster) (1852–1940), Australian educator, son of Jabez Waterhouse
 John Waterhouse Daniel (1845–1933), Canadian physician and Conservative politician
 John William Waterhouse (1849–1917), British Pre-Raphaelite painter
 Joseph Waterhouse (minister) (1828–1881), Australian Methodist minister and missionary in Fiji

K
 Kate Waterhouse (born 1983), Australian model
 Keith Waterhouse (1929–2009), English writer

M
 Matthew Waterhouse (born 1961), British actor
 Michael Waterhouse (1888–1968), British architect

P
 Paul Waterhouse (1861–1924), English architect
 Peter Waterhouse (disambiguation), multiple people, including:
Peter Waterhouse (writer) (born 1956), Austrian writer and translator
Peter Waterhouse (scientist), Australian plant scientist
Peter Waterhouse (military officer) (1779–1823), British military officer

R
 Rachel Waterhouse (born 1923), English historian
 Richard Green Waterhouse, bishop of the Methodist Episcopal Church, South (Southern USA)
 Robbie Waterhouse, Australian bookmaker involved in the Fine Cotton scandal
 Ronald Waterhouse (judge) (1926–2011), Welsh High Court judge
 Rupert Waterhouse (1873–1958), English physician, see Waterhouse-Friderichsen syndrome

S
 Stephen Waterhouse, author Passion for Skiing
 Steven Waterhouse (born 1956), American pastor and author
 Suki Waterhouse, English actress, model and entrepreneur

T
 Tom Waterhouse, Australian bookmaker
 Trent Waterhouse (born 1981), Australian professional rugby league player

W
 Walter Lawry Waterhouse (1887–1969), Australian agricultural scientist
 William Waterhouse (disambiguation), several names, including:
 William Waterhouse (bassoonist) (1931–2007), English bassoonist, father of Graham Waterhouse
 William Waterhouse (violinist) (born 1917), Canadian violinist
 William C. Waterhouse, American mathematician
 William Glenn Waterhouse, American Olympic sailor

See also
 Waterhouse Island (disambiguation)

References

English-language surnames
English toponymic surnames